The White Limestone Group is a geologic group in Jamaica. It preserves fossils dating back to the Paleogene period.

See also

 List of fossiliferous stratigraphic units in Jamaica

References
 

Limestone formations
Paleogene Jamaica
Geologic groups of North America
Geologic formations of Jamaica
Geologic formations of the Caribbean